Karin Dubsky (born 1954) is a German-Irish marine ecologist working in Trinity College Dublin, notable as an environmental activist, the coordinator and co-founder of Coastwatch Europe, an environmental NGO and a member of the European Environmental Bureau.

Dubsky was the Green Party candidate for the 2019 Wexford by-election, in which she was not elected.

Early life and education
Dubsky was born in Bonn, Germany, and grew up on a farm straddling Bannow Bay, County Wexford, Ireland. She attended Newtown School, Waterford and then Trinity College Dublin, where she secured a BA in Zoology.  She then pursued a Masters in Environmental Sciences, taken partly in Galway, completed in Trinity College Dublin.

Career
Dubsky has worked professionally in environmental education, and in research and practical projects, ranging from wetland protection, over waste, oil and litter prevention and control, coastal zone management, environmental law and biodiversity policy.

Environmental programs and campaigns 
Karin Dubsky speaks and campaigns regularly on environmental issues, especially affecting water quality, wetlands, dunes and bathing beaches, in the Irish media. She campaigned for reform of legislation including public information on water quality of bathing beaches, which was introduced in Ireland ahead of other countries.

Dubsky co-designed the Blue Flag for Beaches award programme, co-founded the Irish Clean Air Group, an inter-disciplinary group from TCD and hospitals led by Dr. Luke Clancy, which successfully lobbied for the introduction of smokeless fuel in Ireland, and set up an international volunteer eco-audit of the coast which spread to 23 countries. Data from the survey were used by OSPAR and the EEA.  Data from the Coastwatch survey were also used to lobby for a plastic bag tax in Ireland, which, when introduced, was the first in Europe and brought plastic bag litter down from over 54 per km of shoreline to around 3–4.

She co-authored the chapter on public participation and communication in the World Health Organization's Practical Guide to the Design and Implementation of Assessments and Monitoring Programmes for bathing waters 

Dubsky was appointed to the environmental pillar of Ireland's social partnership in May 2009  and is on NESC (The National Economic and Social Council, the Dublin Regional Authority's Dublin Bay Task Force  and the Wexford Local Development Board. She was a member of the Eastern Regional Fisheries Board from 2005–2010, and Comhar.

Other activities 
Dubsky drew public and official attention to Dublin area raw sewage problems by gaining access to official water monitoring results and organising citizen sewage reports. She further researched treatment options and lobbied for a tertiary treatment plant.

She also acted to halt illegal cockle dredging in Waterford estuary with both media and Senate support.

She exposed wrecking of Kilmuckridge-Tinnaberna Sandhills and together with other Coastwatchers halted the cattle storage and pollution. A restoration order now in place is just being implemented.

In 2014 Dubsky and her husband Paul were refused planning permission to turn part of their home into an "eco-education centre," on the grounds it could cause pollution. In reaching its decision, on an appeal by Dublin-based holiday home owners, the planning board overruled both the local authority and its own inspector, noting the area as being at very high risk from domestic sewage pollution. "The board considered that the proposed development, in close proximity to a stream and to bathing waters, to a proposed drain and to other dwellings, would be prejudicial to public health" it said.

Court cases 
Dubsky took a number of court cases as an individual and as part of Coastwatch. These include a Supreme Court decision that government must give reasons for opinions (Boyne estuary habitat restoration) and High Court injunctive relief to halt creosote sludge dumping in Waterford Port. Dubsky instigated and persisted with EC complaints which ended in the European Court of Justice and belatedly resulted in improvements to landfill sites, provision of compensatory habitat and restoration of wetlands.

Politics 
She withdrew from the Seanad Election of 2011 due to an oversight in official registration of her Irish citizenship over forty years previously, which could not be rectified in time for the beginning of the election.

She contested the 2019 Wexford by-election for the Green Party (Ireland), for the seat left vacant by Mick Wallace after he was elected to the European Parliament, but was not elected.

Awards and achievements 
 Honorary Fellow of the Irish Hotel and Catering Industry (since 2000)
 Designed the Biodiversity and EU enlargement monument, erected in Malahide Castle, 2004
 Environmental Merit Award 2007 from the Chartered Institute of Water and Environmental Management (Ireland branch)
 Drafted the Wexford Wetlands county inventory with Wexford County Council, as first inventory in Ireland

Personal life
As of 2019, Dubsky lives in Ballymoney, Co. Wexford, with her husband Paul. They have a daughter and three sons - Julia, Stephan, Paul and Eoin.

References

External links
Coastwatch

1954 births
German emigrants to Ireland
People from County Wexford
Alumni of Trinity College Dublin
Academics of Trinity College Dublin
Women marine biologists
Women ecologists
Irish environmentalists
Irish women environmentalists
20th-century Irish scientists
21st-century Irish scientists
20th-century Irish women scientists
21st-century Irish women scientists
20th-century Irish biologists
21st-century Irish  biologists
Green Party (Ireland) politicians
Irish women in politics
21st-century Irish women politicians
21st-century Irish politicians
Living people